The Santiago Formation is a geologic formation in Orange and northwestern San Diego County, California. The siltstones, mudstones and sandstones of the formation preserve fossils of Walshina esmaraldensis and Diegoaelurus vanvalkenburghae, dating back to the Late Eocene to Late Oligocene periods (Uintan to Duchesnean in the NALMA classification).

Depositional environment 

Fossil content

Mammals

Ferae

Primatomorphs

Ungulates

Invertebrates

See also 
 List of fossiliferous stratigraphic units in California
 Paleontology in California

References

Bibliography

Further reading 
 Prothero, D.R. 2001. Magnetic stratigraphy of the middle-upper Eocene Santiago Formation, Orange and San Diego Counties, California. Guidebook, Pacific Section, Society of Economic Paleontologists and Mineralogists, 91:107-118

Geologic formations of California
Paleogene California
Duchesnean
Uintan
Priabonian Stage
Rupelian Stage
Chattian Stage
Siltstone formations
Mudstone formations
Sandstone formations
Fluvial deposits
Fossiliferous stratigraphic units of North America
Paleontology in California
Formations
Formations